Smilax tamnoides, common name bristly greenbrier, is a North American species of plants native to the United States and Canada. It is widespread from Ontario and New York State south to Texas and Florida.

The plant has been called Smilax hispida in many publications, but the name Smilax tamnoides is much older and under the botanical rules of priority it is the preferred name.

Smilax tamnoides is a climbing, prickly vine that supports itself on other vegetation. Flowers are green to brown, small but numerous in umbels; fruits blue to black without the waxy coating common on many other species of the genus.

Conservation status in the United States
It is as a special concern species and believed extirpated in Connecticut.

References

External links
Illinois Wildflowers, Bristly Greenbrier Smilax hispida
Lady Bird Johnson Wildflower Centerl University of Texas, Smilax tamnoides L. Bristly greenbrier
Missouri Botanical Garden Plant Finder, Smilax hispida 

Smilacaceae
Flora of North America
Plants described in 1753
Taxa named by Carl Linnaeus